The Muséum d'histoire naturelle de La Rochelle is a natural history museum located in the city of La Rochelle, France.

The museum was reopened after a major renovation in 2007. It displays about 10,000 artifacts from naturalists and ethnographers since the 18th century.

Notes

Gallery

External links
 Official website

Museums in La Rochelle
Natural history museums in France